Peter Kokotowitsch (8 October 1890 – 12 July 1968) was an Austrian wrestler. He competed in the middleweight event at the 1912 Summer Olympics.

References

1890 births
1968 deaths
People from Plaški
People from the Kingdom of Croatia-Slavonia
Olympic wrestlers of Austria
Wrestlers at the 1912 Summer Olympics
Austrian male sport wrestlers